Jacob Albert Pitler (April 22, 1894 – February 3, 1968) was an American second baseman and longtime coach in Major League Baseball. Born in New York City, and Jewish, he moved with his family to Western Pennsylvania when he was a boy, and he grew up in Beaver Falls and Pittsburgh.

Baseball career
He was batting a healthy .364 in 42 games when his contract was purchased by the Pittsburgh Pirates in the midseason of  during the World War I manpower crisis. Pitler holds the record for most putouts in a game by a second baseman, with 15, made in a 22-inning game on August 22, 1917. After rejecting a minor-league assignment in early 1918, Pitler left the ranks of "organized baseball" for almost a decade.

During much of the 1920s, Pitler played in semi-professional or "outlaw" leagues.

In , Pitler joined the Brooklyn Dodgers as a minor league manager, winning back-to-back pennants with the Olean Oilers of the PONY League in 1939–40.

Pitler usually served as Brooklyn's first-base coach and worked under Dodger managers Leo Durocher, Burt Shotton, Chuck Dressen and Walter Alston. He appeared in Roger Kahn's memoir The Boys of Summer as a somewhat obsequious aide to Dressen. But with his minor league managing background, he was also hailed as a fatherly figure to Dodger rookies and young players. He was cited for that role in poet Marianne Moore's paean to the 1955 champions, Hometown Piece for Messrs. Alston and Reese.

Pitler retired as a coach after the  season rather than move with the Dodgers to Los Angeles, but continued his association with the team as a scout. In 1991, he was inducted into the Jewish Sports Hall of Fame in Pittsburgh.

See also
List of select Jewish baseball players

References

Bucek, Jeanine, ed., The Baseball Encyclopedia, 10th edition. New York: Macmillan USA, 1996.
Kahn, Roger, The Boys of Summer. New York: Harper & Row, 1971.
Spink, J. G. Taylor, ed., The Baseball Register. St. Louis: The Sporting News, 1956.

External links

NY Times obit, 2/4/68
Hometown Piece for Messrs. Alston and Reese by Marianne Moore

1894 births
1968 deaths
20th-century American Jews
Baseball coaches from New York (state)
Baseball coaches from Pennsylvania
Baseball players from New York City
Baseball players from Pittsburgh
Binghamton Triplets players
Brooklyn Dodgers coaches
Chattanooga Lookouts players
Hazleton Mountaineers players
Jackson Convicts players
Jackson Chiefs players
Jackson Vets players
Jersey City Skeeters players
Jewish American baseball coaches
Jewish American baseball managers
Jewish American baseball players
Jewish Major League Baseball players
Los Angeles Dodgers scouts
Major League Baseball first base coaches
Major League Baseball infielders
Minor league baseball managers
People from Beaver Falls, Pennsylvania
Pittsburgh Pirates players
Sportspeople from Binghamton, New York
Sportspeople from Pittsburgh
Springfield Chicks players
Springfield Pirates players
Wheeling Stogies players
Wilkes-Barre Barons (baseball) players